John Andrew Hiestand (October 2, 1824 – December 13, 1890) was an American politician from Pennsylvania who served as a Republican member of the U.S. House of Representatives from Pennsylvania.

Biography
John A. Hiestand was born in East Donegal Township, Pennsylvania.  He attended the common schools, an academy in Marietta, Pennsylvania, and Pennsylvania College at Gettysburg, Pennsylvania.  He studied law, was admitted to the bar in 1849 and commenced practice in Lancaster, Pennsylvania.

Hiestand was elected as a Whig to the Pennsylvania State House of Representatives in 1852, 1853, and 1856.  He purchased an interest in the Lancaster Examiner in 1858 and relinquished the practice of law.  He served in the Pennsylvania State Senate for the 16th district in 1861.  He was an unsuccessful candidate in 1868 to Congress to fill the unexpired term of Thaddeus Stevens.  He was appointed by President Ulysses Grant in 1871 naval officer at the port of Philadelphia.  He was reappointed in 1875 and served until 1879.

Hiestand was elected as a Republican to the Forty-ninth and Fiftieth Congresses.  He was an unsuccessful candidate for reelection in 1888. He died in Lancaster in 1890 and was interred in Marietta Cemetery, Marietta, Pennsylvania.

References

Sources

John Andrew Hiestand at The Political Graveyard

|-

|-

1824 births
1890 deaths
19th-century American politicians
American people of Swiss descent
Burials in Pennsylvania
Gettysburg College alumni
Members of the Pennsylvania House of Representatives
Pennsylvania lawyers
Pennsylvania state senators
Pennsylvania Whigs
Politicians from Lancaster, Pennsylvania
Republican Party members of the United States House of Representatives from Pennsylvania
19th-century American lawyers